"Breathless" is the fifth and final single from Corinne Bailey Rae's debut album, Corinne Bailey Rae. Released in 2007 only in the United States.

Released and charts performance
"Breathless" started receiving digital download on the iTunes Store on 6 February 2007, prior to its official single release on 30 November 2007. The song charted only on the US Hot R&B/Hip-Hop Songs chart at number 70, and spent 12 weeks on the chart.

Charts

Radio and release history

References

2007 singles
Corinne Bailey Rae songs
Songs written by Corinne Bailey Rae
Soul ballads
Contemporary R&B ballads
2006 songs
EMI Records singles